Pison morosum is a solitary wasp of the family Crabronidae. It is the only endemic species of Pison wasp to New Zealand. It was first described by entomologist Frederick Smith in 1858.

Description

The species has an entirely black body. Female specimens vary in length between 7.5 and 11.5 mm, and male specimens between 5.5 and 8.0 mm. It can be distinguished from Pison spinolae due to the lack of long erect hairs.

Distribution

Pison morosum is found throughout the mainland of New Zealand, as well as the Chatham Islands to the east.

Parasites

Similar to Pison spinolae, wasp pupae are hosts to Melittobia wasps.

References

See also

Crabronidae
Endemic fauna of New Zealand
Fauna of the Chatham Islands
Hymenoptera of New Zealand
Insects described in 1858
Taxa named by Frederick Smith (entomologist)